"Funky Town" is Namie Amuro's 32nd solo single under the Avex Trax label. It was released in CD and CD&DVD formats on April 4, 2007, three months after the release of her previous single "Baby Don't Cry".

"Funky Town" was ranked #44 on Recochoko's Download Chart and the video was ranked #4 on the PV Download Chart.

Overview 
For the release of "Funky Town", Amuro returned to work with frequent married producers Michico and T. Kura. The song is described as being a dancey new number, produced by frequent collaborators T. Kura and Michico along with the L.L. Brothers. The b-side, entitled "Darling," is said to be an adult and stylish dance tune produced by Coldfeet. Also, uncommon for Amuro, first pressing editions of the "Funky Town" single came with a disco ball keychain - the CD&DVD version came with a gold disco ball keychain, and the CD only came with a silver disco ball keychain.

Commercial endorsements 
"Funky Town" was used in a new commercial campaign for a redesigned version of the lemon tea Lipton Limone. The new commercial featured Amuro herself and began broadcast on March 20, 2007.

Music video 
The promotional video for "Funky Town" found Namie working with director , instead of long-time director .

The video begins with the words "Funky Town" on the screen, in the same font seen on the single's cover. The video featured scenes of Namie performing choreography with a group of dancers all wearing black in a black room in featuring a car; dancing against a large screen featuring footage of her face on it; and towards the end singing amid a pile of golden disco balls.

Track listing

Personnel 
 "Funky Town"
Namie Amuro – vocals
L.L. Brothers, Warner, Michico - additional vocals
Giantswing Production (T. Kura, Michico, L.L. Brothers) - productions
 "Darling"
Namie Amuro – vocals
Coldfeet - productions
Lori Fine - keyboards
Watusi - programming & instruments
Terrassy - guitars

Production 
 "Funky Town"
Producers – T.Kura, Michico, L.L. Brothers
Choreographer - Hirotsugu Kurosu
Director - Masaaki Uchino
 "Darling"
Producer - Coldfeet

TV performances 
 March 16, 2007 - PopJam Reprise
 April 5, 2007 - Sakigake! Ongaku Banzuke SP
 April 6, 2007 - Music Fighter
 April 7, 2007 - CDTV

Charts 
Oricon Sales Chart (Japan)

RIAJ certification
"Funky Town" has been certified gold for shipments of over 100,000 by the Recording Industry Association of Japan. In 2011 as a ringtone, it has received a double platinum certification, for being downloaded more than 500,000 times.

References

2007 singles
Namie Amuro songs
2005 songs
Avex Trax singles